The following is a list of all stations of the Transilien network.

RER stations are not included in this list; see the separate list of RER stations.

Tram stops (line 4 and line 11 Express) are not included in this list; see the separate List of tram stops in Île-de-France.

Stations

See also 
 Transilien
 List of SNCF stations in Île-de-France
 List of RER stations
 List of tram stops in Île-de-France

References 
 SNCF Open Data - Gares et points d'arrêt du réseau Transilien
 Open Data Île-de-France Mobilités - Gares et stations du réseau ferré d'Île-de-France (par ligne)
 SNCF Transilien RER et Trains 

Transilien